Elachista nevadella is a moth of the family Elachistidae. It is found in Spain.

References

nevadella
Moths described in 2000
Moths of Europe